Statistics of Allsvenskan in season 1988.

Overview
The league was contested by 12 teams, with Malmö FF winning the league and the Swedish championship after the play-offs.

League table

Results

Allsvenskan play-offs 
The 1988 Allsvenskan play-offs was the seventh edition of the competition. The four best placed teams from Allsvenskan qualified to the competition. Allsvenskan champions Malmö FF won the competition and the Swedish championship after defeating Djurgården who finished third in the league.

Semi-finals

First leg

Second leg

Final

Season statistics

Top scorers

Footnotes

References 

Allsvenskan seasons
Swed
Swed
1